The Berchezoaia is a right tributary of the river Bârsău in Romania. It flows into the Bârsău between Șomcuta Mare and Finteușu Mare.

References

Rivers of Romania
Rivers of Maramureș County